The Literary Front was a Bulgarian weekly newspaper for literature, literary criticism and art. It was published by the Union of Bulgarian Writers from 1945 to 1993, when it was renamed the Literary Forum.

Editors 
The editors-in-chief of the Literary Front were:

Nikola Furnadzhiev (1945–1949)
Veselin Andreev (1949–1955)
Slavcho Vasev (1955–1964)
Georgi Dimitrov-Goshkin (1964–1966)
Bogomil Raynov (1966–1970)
Lubomir Levchev (1970–1973)
Efrem Karanfilov (1973–1980)
Nikola Indjov (1980–1983)
Rusi Bozhanov (1983–1984)
Evtim Evtimov (1984–1988)
Lilyana Stefanova (1988–1989)
Marko Ganchev (1989–1993)

References 

Literary magazines
Weekly newspapers published in Bulgaria
1945 establishments in Bulgaria
1993 disestablishments in Bulgaria
Bulgarian literature